Jagna Janicka (born 1959) is a Polish film and stage costume and scene designer.

She graduated from the Jan Matejko Academy of Fine Arts, Krakow, Department of Stage, Film and TV Scenic Design, in 1987. She is a member of the Polish Film Academy and the European Film Academy.

Selected awards
 2012: Gdynia Film Festival award for costume design, In Darkness
 2015: Gdynia Film Festival award for scenic design, 
 2015: Eagle Award for scenic design, Hiszpanka
 2018: Gdynia Film Festival award for scenic design, Clergy

References

External links

1959 births
Living people
Polish scenic designers
Polish costume designers
Jan Matejko Academy of Fine Arts alumni